Mohamed Zilaal (born April 27, 1985) is a Maldivian retired basketball player. He is regarded by both peers and contemporaries as the greatest Maldivian player of his generation. In 16 professional seasons, Zilaal accumulated more championship medals (along with star point guard Ali Fazlee) and individual achievement awards than any other player in history. He also retired with the most starts, minutes and points for the Maldives senior men's national basketball team, including captaining the team to its best result to date in international competition – a silver medal in the 2016 SABA Qualification Tournament in Bangalore, India. He made his international debut while still in school. Standing at 5 ft 8 in (1.72 m), Zilaal played both point guard and shooting guard.
Mohamed Zilaal, commonly known as Zila, was scouted heavily while still in secondary school in Majeediyyaa School in Male'. His early mentorship and coaching was overseen by the then Maldives coaches Shiyam and Ilyas (in school) and Supun Wimal of Sri Lanka (in the national pool). After playing one tournament for Unitours, he joined Victory Sports Club, with whom he won the national tournament 6 times out of 8 seasons. He was a vital cog in the Maldives senior men's national basketball team from his final year in school all the way up to his retirement in 2019. After playing one successful seasons for the then newly formed T-Rex Basketball Club, Zilaal (together with 3 of his club and national team colleagues) transferred to then newly promoted Red Line Club (RLC). He would go on to spend four successful seasons at RLC before joining Kings Basketball Club upon its formation in 2017. Throughout his 3-year stint at Kings BC, he would captain the team in every single season, while adding to his record breaking collection of winners' and top 5 players' medals. Immediately after leading Kings BC to its first National Basketball Tournament success in 2018, Zila announced that the 2019 season would be his 16th and final as a player, both for club and country. In his final season, he would end his domestic career by carrying Kings BC to an undefeated triumph in the MBA Championship, followed by a packed schedule of international tournaments and tours, representing his country as captain in every single game until he hung up his sneakers in December 2019. From the early stages of his playing career, Zilaal was heavily involved in the youth development programmes of the Maldives Basketball Association (MBA), through which he completed FIBA Coaching certifications and refresher courses, including a Level-2 licenses, and continued to train children and youths, including assignments as Head Coach of Iskandar School in domestic interschool tournaments, as well as through the Ballers Academy, of which he was a co-founder. He continues to be active in coaching even after his 2019 retirement.

Career highlights and awards

Maldives National Award of Recognition for Services to Sports as a Player (very first active basketball player to receive the honor) in 2016
3 x Haveeru Award for Best Basketball Player in Maldives (2008, 2011, 2012) (the most)
8 x National Basketball League Champion (2007, 2008, 2009, 2010, 2011, 2012, 2014, 2017)
10 × National Basketball Tournament Champion (2004, 2005, 2007, 2008, 2009, 2011, 2012, 2013, 2015, 2018)
13 × MBA Championship Champion (2005, 2006, 2007, 2008, 2009, 2010, 2011, 2012, 2013, 2014, 2015, 2016, 2019) (equal most)
4 x MBA Invitational Championship (2004, 2007, 2010, 2011) (equal most)
South Asian Regional 3x3 Tournament (Sri Lanka) - Bronze Medal
FIBA Asia Qualification Tournament (SABA Zone) (Bangalore, India) - Silver Medal
Most career points in domestic tournaments
Most points in a single game (67 points in 2013 versus V United SC) (single game domestic scoring record until it was broken numerous times in 2016 and 2017)
Most points scored for Maldives national team
Most minutes played for Maldives national team
Most starts for Maldives national team
Most promising player (under-21) in 2004
Man of the Tournament in 1st MBA Invitational Basketball Tournament (2004)
National Youth Award for Sports (2011)

Early life
Zilaal credits his parents, especially his father, as the single biggest influence in his sporting success. Along with his younger brother Ahmed Zabeer (who would himself go on to achieve iconic status for club and country in basketball, including playing with and against his older brother), Zilaal was encouraged by his family to hone his basketball skills from a young age. He displayed a high aptitude under the tutelage of his school coaches and was selected to a pool of young talents for special coaching by the then national coach, Supun Wimal of Sri Lanka.

Professional career

Early career from 2004-2011 (Unitours, Victory SC, T-Rex BC)

Zilaal made his professional debut for Unitours. At the time, the domestic tournaments did not record advanced statistics as they do today. He finished the tournament as the runaway leading scorer, although the team failed to reach the finals. His ability to dominate in offense, including an effective perimeter shot was on display throughout his rookie season. Sudden bursts of speed, tremendous court vision and scoring prowess meant that, before the start of the year-end National Tournament of 2003, he was scouted by the top clubs at the time, leading to him and his colleague Ahmed Afsan Rashad transferring to the all-conquering Victory SC.
It was at Victory SC that he first teamed up with outstanding point guard Ali Fazlee (after their trailblazing exploits in school). The duo would go on to break all domestic and national team records, attaining iconic status as the most dominant back court in Maldives.

Zilaal's Victory SC debut was also the first opportunity he got to play alongside Zakariyya Shiham, who would go on to be his brother-in-law. The team already boasted talented guard Ilyas Ibrahim, who had earlier coached Zilaal in school and would go on to captain the national team.

By his second season at Victory SC, Zilaal was joined by his talented younger brother Ahmed Zabeer. The following year would see the arrival of brilliant forward Ahmed Firash, who would go on to play with Zilaal for the rest of his domestic career. Victory SC lived up to its name, winning the National Tournament as a three-peat, twice! They would also win the National League from its inauguration in 2007, until the team stopped competing in domestic basketball tournaments after the 2011 season.

Victory was coached by renowned local FIBA licensed coach Hassan Ismail, who is the current Vice President of the Maldives Basketball Association.

His days at Victory had also brought watershed moments in his life outside basketball. It was through the game that he loved that he found his partner in life Fathimath Rishma. She shares similar stardom in the women's game as Zila does in the men's game. They were married in 2006. Their son Ismail Zuiz Mohamed Zilaal would also be born in 2008, at a time when Zilaal was lighting up the game in the red and yellow of Victory.
Following the 2011 season, Victory SC stopped participating in domestic basketball tournaments. Zilaal and most of his teammates would go on to launch T-Rex BC, a club that would be synonymous with outstanding achievement in Maldives for the next decade. The team was coached by former national player, Ibrahim Nahid. Zilaal, though, would only play one season for the club, before yet another major shakeup in the domestic game. Zilaal, Afsan, Fazlee and Firash would all join the newly promoted Red Line Club (RLC).

Birth of an Icon 2011-2016 (Red Line Club)

The arrival of RLC to Division 1 basketball in Maldives saw the birth of a long-standing on court rivalry with T-Rex BC. Zilaal and his RLC team would battle T-Rex led by his brother and brother-in-law, together with a younger, highly talented core led by Ibrahim Rashwaan.

For the next four years, RLC, T-Rex and Hurricane BC would battle it out for top honors in domestic basketball tournaments.

RLC would be coached by prominent local coaches including Ali Sofeeh, Ilyas Ibrahim, Mohamed Dhaudh and Mohamed Fayaz, as well as Serb Marko Piplovic, who would go on to coach the national team led by Zilaal to its 2016 silver medal achievement.
While at RLC, Zilaal would go on to win the MBA Championship in each season, in addition to adding to his tally of MBA Cup, MBA Invitational Cup, National League and National Championship victories.

Cementing the Legacy 2017-2019 (Kings Basketball Club)

In 2017, Zilaal signed for Kings BC together with many of his RLC teammates. The newly formed team, captained by Zilaal, made an immediate impact, reaching the finals of every single domestic tournament in its first year, including winning the National Basketball League.

In 2018, Kings would again repeat the feat of reaching the finals of every domestic competition, while going one better than the previous season in winning the National Basketball Tournament.

In his final season, he would lead his Kings BC side to an undefeated triumph in the 2019 MBA Championship. His final game was a celebration of his remarkable career, with his fans, teammates and family in attendance wearing "6:16" "#LastDance" "GOATZila" t-shirts dedicated to a basketball icon. He had a remarkable game.

At various points, Kings BC would be coached and trained by Sri Lankan Sriyantha Jayaweera, local coaches Ali Isham and Mohamed Naseer, and Jay Salazar Cambarihan and Eric Samson of the Philippines.

In his later years, he would leave his customary shooting guard position to utilize his amazing leadership, ball IQ and court awareness as point guard. In his final game, he led his team to the biggest finals winning margin in history. He would also mirror this swap in position for the national team.

National team career (2003-2019)
Zilaal made his national team debut while still in school. He, along with fellow junior pool member Ali Fazlee, were picked to represent the country in 2003. Zilaal was 17 years old. He would, in fact, complete his first overseas tour with the national team and returned to sit his O-Level exams the following day!

Over 17 years, Zilaal would go on to represent Maldives in numerous FIBA Asia and SABA tournaments, as well as Indian Ocean Island Games, South Asian Federation Games and other regional invitational competitions. He also represented Maldives in 3x3, captaining the team to the very first international medal finish, bringing home the bronze in 2011. The team was completed by the three players whose own careers largely mirrored Zilaal in appearances for club and country - Ahmed Afsan Rashad, Ali Fazlee and Ahmed Firash.

Zilaal would also captain the Maldives to its best international result to date, runners-up of the 2016 FIBA Asia SABA Zone Qualification Tournament in Bangalore, India. Other stalwarts of the national team who played alongside Zilaal across his illustrious career are his brother Ahmed Zabeer, brother-in-law Zakariyya Shiham and Ilyas Ibrahim. Zakariyya holds the record for the most appearances for his country.

Zilaal became the captain of Maldives in 2015, following the retirement of Ilyas Ibrahim. He finished his 17-year national career as the top scorer and most minutes and starts for Maldives.
Zilaal is also recognized by his regional rivals as one of the top guards and would always attract added attention in coaches' plans when facing the diminutive yet quick, sharpshooting Maldivians.

Key international appearances:

 1st Islamic Solidarity Games (2005 Medina, Saudi Arabia)
 11th South Asian Games (2005 Medina, Saudi Arabia)
 Invitational Basketball Tournament (2010 Dhaka, Bangladesh)
 Indian Ocean Island Games (2011 Seychelles)
 Beach Games (2011 Hambantota, Sri Lanka) - bronze medal (as captain)
 SABA Championship (2013 Dhaka, Bangladesh) - player of the tournament
 SABA Championship (2014 Kathmandu, Nepal)
 Asian Beach Games (2014 Phuket, Thailand)
 Asian Games (2014 Incheon, South Korea)
 SABA Championship (2015 Bangalore, India) - silver medal (as captain)
 Indian Ocean Island Games (2015 Reunion Islands)
 FIBA Asia Challenge Qualifying (2016 Bangalore, India) - bronze medal (as captain)
SABA Championship (2017 Male', Maldives)
FIBA Asia Cup, SABA Pre-qualifiers (2018, Dhaka, Bangladesh)
South Asian Games (2019 Kathmandu, Nepal)
Indian Ocean Island Games (2019 Mauritius)

Coaching

Zilaal is admired by the new generation of ballers and has always been a willing teacher for budding talent. His passion for coaching was evident from a very young age. From the start of his playing career, Zilaal was active in the Maldives Basketball Association Youth Development Programme (YDP), as a coach. He began coaching under 9 and under 11 age groups. He has coached schools, colleges, offices and Division 2 teams, along the way. His first international assignment as a coach was with the National Youth 3x3 team, at the Asian Youth Games in Nanjing, China in 2013. He did his Level-1 certificate in coaching in 2005, and went on to complete his Level-2 certificate in 2014.

At present, Zilaal is coaching Iskandar School. Zilaal would place special emphasis on developing the women's game, throughout his coaching career. Since taking up coaching the Iskandar School programme in 2009, Zilaal has brought numerous championships for the school in every annual interschool meet.

In 2018, he, along with some colleagues, would register Ballers Academy, to pass on their knowledge to the youth.

Post-retirement
After retiring from the game he loved, Zilaal has dedicated more time to his family. He takes a lot of pride in tutoring his young son, as he takes his first steps in competitive basketball. He continues to support his wife Rishma as she added to her personal list of basketball triumphs.

He continues to serve in the public service at the Maldives Immigration, the organisation he joined 16 years ago as on leaving school. Through dedication and training, he has risen up the ranks and is now in the post of Deputy Chief Immigration Officer. Rishma too is employed in the same organisation. With Zilaal at the helm, the Maldives Immigration has racked up numerous trophies in corporate, mercantile and office basketball leagues.

Player profile

A combo guard of immense skill, Zilaal is a true leader on court. With sleek handles, a repetitious shooting stroke and amazing court vision, his sheer presence on court boosts his teams towards outstanding performances. His penetration to the basket is strong yet graceful. A volume scorer, including an accurate perimeter dart, Zilaal is also an effective defender. Lethal in pick and roll situations, he is often the trigger to step on the pace in transition. After spending many years as a shooting guard and earning so many of his individual accolades as a scoring threat, in the latter years of his illustrious career, he displayed his versatility and passing ability by playing the point and notching up the most assists in the league.

Legacy
Zilaal is a modern-day icon in Maldivian sports. A role model to many younger players, he is admired by his peers for his disciplined lifestyle. His national award recognition is in part due to his longevity in the game without controversy or scandal. He has also been exemplary in maintaining his body, through good dietary habits and avoiding major injuries through his storied career. He has participated in national awareness campaigns, including the fight against smoking and tobacco use.

Personal life and family
Zilaal hails from a family of athletes. His brother Ahmed Zabeer is a generational basketball talent. The on court duels between the brothers are legendary. Zilaal is married to one of the greatest women basketball players in Maldives, Fathimath Rishma. Zilaal's brother-in-law Zakariyya Shiham is yet another national team stalwart, playing alongside and against Zilaal in epic battles on the domestic circuit, and holding the distinction of having the most appearances for the national team. Zilaal's niece Ayesha Afkaar Mohamed Nasir recently made her national team debut and is among the brightest stars of the future in the women's game. Zilaal and Rishma have one son, 14-year-old Ismail Zuiz Mohamed Zilaal. Rishma was the first recipient of the Sportswoman of the Year award in 2006. In 2009, she also won the Basketball Player of the Year in 2009. One year after her husband, she too received the National Award of Recognition for Services to Sports, in 2017.

Zilaal joined the Maldives Immigration Department in 2004. He has an Associated Degree in Security and Law Enforcement Studies, and is currently completing a master's degree in leadership and management. Throughout his 17-year career in the public service, he has amassed numerous qualifications in his field, and currently holds the position of Deputy Chief Immigration Officer.

Media
Zilaal gives regular media interviews promoting basketball. As an icon of Maldivian sports, he makes frequent public appearances on television.

Awards and accomplishments

Maldives National Award of Recognition for Services to Sports as a Player (very first active basketball player to receive the honour) in 2016
3 x Haveeru Award for Best Basketball Player in Maldives (2008, 2011, 2012) (the most)
8 x National Basketball League Champion (2007, 2008, 2009, 2010, 2011, 2012, 2014, 2017)
10 × National Basketball Tournament Champion (2004, 2005, 2007, 2008, 2009, 2011, 2012, 2013, 2015, 2018)
13 × MBA Championship Champion (2005, 2006, 2007, 2008, 2009, 2010, 2011, 2012, 2013, 2014, 2015, 2016, 2019) (equal most)
4x MBA Invitational Championship (2004, 2007, 2010, 2011) (equal most)
South Asian Regional 3x3 Tournament - Bronze Medal
FIBA Asia Qualification Tournament (SABA Zone) - Silver Medal
Most career points in domestic tournaments
Most career points for the national team
Most career appearances for the national team
Most points in a single game (67 points in 2013 versus V United SC) (single game domestic scoring record until it was broken numerous times in 2016)
Most promising player (best-21 player) in (2003) (award shared with Fathimath Rishma (women's), who would go on to be Zilaal's wife
Man of the Tournament in the 1st MBA Invitational Championship (2004)
National Basketball Tournament MVP (2005, 2011)
MBA Star Player (2008)
MBA Player of the Year (2008, 2011)
MBA Championship MVP (2012)
National Basketball League Top Scorer (2012)
MBA Championship Top Scorer (2012)
National Basketball League Most Assists (2018)
MBA Championship Most Assists (2019)
National Youth Award for Sports (2011)

References and notes

External links
 MBA Invitational Championship
 National Basketball Tournament
 MBA Championship
 National Basketball League

Living people
Maldivian men's basketball players
Basketball players at the 2014 Asian Games
Asian Games competitors for the Maldives
Guards (basketball)
1985 births